Nandura railway station is located in Nandura city of Buldhana district, Maharashtra. Its code is NN. It has two platforms. Passenger, Express, and Superfast trains halt here.

Trains

The following trains halt at Nandura railway station in both directions:

 Surat–Amravati Express
 Sewagram Express
 Shalimar–Lokmanya Tilak Terminus Express
 Maharashtra Express
 Howrah–Ahmedabad Superfast Express
 Vidarbha Express
 Mumbai–Amravati Express
 Navjeevan Express
 Howrah–Mumbai Mail
 Puri–Ajmer Express

References 

Railway stations in Buldhana district
Bhusawal railway division